Richard Chevolleau  is a Jamaican–Canadian actor, best known for playing Augur on Earth: Final Conflict from 1997 to 2002.

Early life
Chevolleau was born in Kingston, Jamaica, and raised in Toronto. After completing high school, he studied the Meisner Technique of acting with Paul Bardier.

Career 
He began his career in the late 1980s with guest parts in the television series My Secret Identity and Friday the 13th: The Series, before having his first major starring role in the 1989 television film Pray for Me, Paul Henderson.

In 1994 he had a starring role in the television series Boogies Diner.

In 1995 he starred in Clement Virgo's film Rude. He also starred in Virgo's 1997 film The Planet of Junior Brown.

He has appeared in supporting roles in the television series Street Time, This Is Wonderland, 'Da Kink in My Hair, Lost Girl, She's the Mayor, Saving Hope, Hannibal, Blood and Water, Killjoys, Hudson & Rex and Murdoch Mysteries, 
the films Lulu (1996), The Wrong Guy (1997), Narc (2002), Lie with Me (2005), Four Brothers (2005), Talk to Me (2007), The Gospel According to the Blues (2010), and Home Again (2012), and on stage as Cory in a production of August Wilson's Fences for Theatre Calgary and the National Arts Centre.

In 2004, he had a guest appearance in the CTV series The Eleventh Hour as Gilbert Brown, a prison inmate who had been victimized by a brutal gang rape. He won the Gemini Award for Best Performance by an Actor in a Guest Role in a Dramatic Series at the 19th Gemini Awards in 2004, and the ACTRA Award for Best Actor in 2005.

References

External links
 

1966 births
Living people
Canadian male television actors
Canadian male film actors
Canadian male stage actors
Canadian Screen Award winners
Male actors from Toronto
Black Canadian male actors
Canadian people of Jamaican descent